Witch Way Love (original title "Un Amour de Sorcière") is a 1997 French fantasy film written and directed by René Manzor.

Plot
Morgane descends from a long line of witches. Her son Arthur has an innate gift for witchcraft. Yet Morgane wants him to become a normal human being without supernatural powers. There is only one way to achieve that. She needs to carry out an ancient ritual which requires the presence of a person who was born under a very specific constellation. The US-American inventor Michael meets all requirements.  Morgane takes him to her family's castle in France. Meanwhile, the evil sorcerer Molok has a different plan . He kidnaps Arthur and tries to make him his successor.

Cast
 Vanessa Paradis as Morgane Edramareck
 Jean Reno as Molok Edramareck
 Gil Bellows as Michael Firth
 Jeanne Moreau as Eglantine Edramareck
 Dabney Coleman as Joel Andrews
 Katrine Boorman as Rita
 Malcolm Dixon as Merlin
 Fantin Lalanne as Arthur Edramareck
 Éléonore Hirt as Chloé Edramareck
 Louise Vincent as Fleur Edramareck

Reception
Variety judged this was "a weak tale of strong magic".

Two Versions

The movie has two language versions. One in French and one in English. The French version is widely available on DVD while the English one is hard to find.

References

External links
 
 
 

1997 films
1997 fantasy films
1990s French-language films
Films set in France
Films about witchcraft
Films directed by René Manzor
Films with screenplays by René Manzor
French fantasy films
1990s French films